Sigillum Magnum is a silver-bronze medal realized in 1888. The medal is composed by some single medals of the Corporations which were forming the Bolognese Study. It is a recognition given to important and influential people by the University of Bologna. The first recipient of the Sigillum Magnum was Giuseppe Saragat in 1971.

References 

University of Bologna